Aurora High School is a public high school located in Aurora, Ohio, United States.  It is the only high school in the Aurora City School District.

In 2007, Aurora was recognized as a Blue Ribbon School by the National Blue Ribbon Schools Program with 257 other high schools.

U.S. News & World Report ranking

State championships
 Boys' American football – 2008
 Boys' Golf – 1971
 Boys' Wrestling – 1995

External links

 Aurora City School District website

Notes and references

High schools in Portage County, Ohio
Public high schools in Ohio
Aurora, Ohio